Jerry L. Larson (May 17, 1936 – April 25, 2018) was an American judge who served as an associate justice of the Iowa Supreme Court from 1978 to 2008.

Background 
Larson was born in Harlan, Iowa on May 17, 1936. He received his bachelor's and law degrees in 1958 and 1960 from the University of Iowa. Larson served as county attorney for Shelby County from 1965 to 1970. Larson then served as an Iowa District Court judge from 1975 to 1978. He died in Harlan on April 25, 2018, at the age of 81.

References

External links

1936 births
2018 deaths
People from Harlan, Iowa
University of Iowa alumni
University of Iowa College of Law alumni
District attorneys in Iowa
Iowa state court judges
Justices of the Iowa Supreme Court
20th-century American judges